Noria Sosala  (born 25 December 1988) is a Zambian footballer who plays as a forward for the Zambia women's national team. She was part of the team at the 2014 African Women's Championship. On club level she played for National Assembly F.C. in Zambia.

References

External links
 CAF player profile

1988 births
Living people
Zambian women's footballers
Zambia women's international footballers
Place of birth missing (living people)
Women's association football forwards